Aphomia poliocyma is a species of snout moth in the genus Aphomia. It was described by Turner in 1937, and is known from Australia (it was described from Sydney).

References

Moths described in 1937
Tirathabini
Moths of Australia